Valchitran is a village in Pleven Province, central northern Bulgaria. The Thracian-era Valchitran treasure was discovered nearby.

Valchitran has Nikita Khrushchev as an honorary citizen. Khrushchev was on his way to Sofia in a plane, when the plane experienced technical difficulties and had to land in Kamenetz, Pleven Oblast, a small town nearby which had a military airfield.  Khrushchev had to pass through Valchitran in order to get to Sofia.

References

Villages in Pleven Province